The 1922 United States Senate election in Delaware took place on November 7, 1922. This election pitted Delaware's two most powerful families, the Republican du Ponts and the Democratic Bayards, against each other.

Incumbent Democratic Senator Josiah O. Wolcott resigned on July 2, 1921, to accept an appointment as Chancellor of Delaware. Governor William D. Denney appointed businessman and Republican National Committeeman T. Coleman du Pont to fill the vacancy until a successor could be duly elected. Democrat Thomas F. Bayard Jr. narrowly won both the special election to complete Wolcott's term and the regularly scheduled election, both held on November 7. Because Bayard won both elections on the same day, he became a two-term Senator with his second term beginning March 4, 1923.

du Pont would later be elected to Delaware's other Senate seat and served from 1925 to 1928.

General election

Candidates
Thomas F. Bayard Jr., former chairman of the Democratic State Committee and son of former Senator Thomas F. Bayard (Democratic)
T. Coleman du Pont, incumbent Senator since 1921 (Republican)
Frank Stephens (Forward)

Results

Special election

See also 
 1922 United States Senate elections

References

Delaware
1922
1922 Delaware elections